Enga Veettu Penn is a 1965 Indian Tamil-language drama film directed by Tapi Chanakya and produced by Nagi Reddi and Chakrapani of Vijaya Combines Productions. A remake of the company's own Telugu film Shavukaru (1950), it features an ensemble cast that consists of M. R. Radha, S. V. Subbaiah, A. V. M. Rajan, Jaishankar, K. A. Thangavelu, Nagesh, V. Nagayya, O. A. K. Thevar and Nirmala, who became known as Vijaya Nirmala after its release. The film was released on 23 October 1965.

Plot

Cast 
Male cast
 M. R. Radha as Nagalingam
 S. V. Subbaiah as Ramaiya
 A. V. M. Rajan as Chandran
 Jaishankar as Narayanan
 K. A. Thangavelu as Thanakodi
 Nagesh as Karunaimalai
V. Nagayya as the blind ascetic
 O. A. K. Thevar as Rangan
 Kottapuli Jayaraman as Aadiyapadham
 Usilai Mani as Vellimalai
 K. K. Soundar as Lawyer

Female cast
 Nirmala as Lakshmi
 C. Vasantha as Santha
 Manorama as Raami
 Madhavi as Bakkiam
 N. Seethalakshmi as Anjalai

Production 
Enga Veetu Penn was directed by Tapi Chanakya and produced by Nagi Reddi and Chakrapani of Vijaya Combines Productions. It was remade from the company's own Telugu production Shavukaru (1950), and co-producer Chakrapani doubled as screenwriter, making the film more modern than the Telugu original. Cinematography was handled by Marcus Bartley, editing by C. P. Jambulingam, and art direction by S. Krishna Rao and Kaladhar. S. V. Ranga Rao, originally part of the cast, criticised the casting of Nirmala as the female lead, feeling she looked "too frail" to play her character, and ordered the producers to replace her. Reddi cancelled shooting for the day. The next day, Nirmala was called back to the studio, and realised that Ranga Rao was replaced by S. V. Subbaiah.

Soundtrack 
The soundtrack was composed by K. V. Mahadevan, while Kannadasan and Alangudi Somu were the lyricists.

Release and reception 

Enga Veetu Penn was released on 23 October 1965, Diwali day. Writing in Sport and Pastime, T. M. Ramachandran called it a "damp squib", saying that "the picture attempts to sustain the interest of the viewers with its heartwarming story but the audience cannot but see a ring of familiarity around the whole theme." He applauded the performances of the cast, particularly Jaishankar and Rajan, but criticised the abundance of songs, saying that "holds up the story many a time". After the film's release, Nirmala prefixed Vijaya, the studio's name, to her screen name.

References

Bibliography

External links 
 

1960s Tamil-language films
1965 drama films
1965 films
Films directed by Tapi Chanakya
Films scored by K. V. Mahadevan
Indian drama films
Tamil remakes of Telugu films